Theerthakkarai is a holy place of Ayyavazhi. It is the second holiest sea-theertham according to Akilam. This is the place where the second and third Vinchais of Vaikundar took place. It was in memory of this event the Panguni Theertham is conducted.

See also
 Vinchai to Vaikundar
 Ayyavazhi rituals

References

Ayyavazhi